Dimemorfan (INN) (or dimemorphan) (brand names Astomin, Dastosirr, Tusben), or dimemorfan phosphate (JAN), also known as 3,17-dimethylmorphinan, is an antitussive (cough suppressant) of the morphinan family that is widely used in Japan and is also marketed in Spain and Italy. It was developed by Yamanouchi Pharmaceutical (now Astellas Pharma) and introduced in Japan in 1975. It was later introduced in Spain in 1981 and Japan in 1985.

Side effects
Adverse effects include nausea, somnolence, dry mouth, and decreased appetite.

Pharmacology
Dimemorfan is an analogue of dextromethorphan (DXM) and its active metabolite dextrorphan (DXO), and similarly to them, acts as a potent agonist of the σ1 receptor (Ki = 151 nM). However, unlike DXM and DXO, it does not act significantly as an NMDA receptor antagonist (Ki = 16,978 nM), and for this reason, lacks dissociative effects, thereby having reduced side effects and abuse potential in comparison. Similarly to DXM and DXO, dimemorfan has only relatively low affinity for the σ2 receptor (Ki = 4,421 nM).

See also 
 Cough syrup
 Noscapine
 Codeine; Pholcodine
 Dextromethorphan
 Racemorphan; Dextrorphan; Levorphanol
 Butamirate
 Pentoxyverine
 Tipepidine
 Cloperastine
 Levocloperastine

References 

Antitussives
Morphinans
Sigma agonists
Astellas Pharma